Trans7 or TRANS7 in all capitals (pronounced Trans Tujuh in Indonesian, formerly known as TV7) is an Indonesian free-to-air television network owned by Trans Media, a part of Trans Corp, which in turn a subsidiary of CT Corp. For the first time, Trans7 was the official broadcaster of 2018 FIFA World Cup together with the sister channel Trans TV, also with Telkom Indonesia, K-Vision and MNC Media (MNC Vision only). Trans7 had broadcast 8 group-stage matches as well as shared broadcasting of quarterfinal, semifinal, 3rd place playoff, and final matches from Trans TV, also from UseeTV (now IndiHome TV), K-Vision, and MNC Sports.

The channel was officially launched as TV7 on 25 November 2001 at 5:00 PM local time. The final transmission and broadcast aired on 15 December 2006 at 19:00 WIB. The network was then sold by Kompas Gramedia Group and the new owners changed the name from TV7 to Trans7.

History 

Trans7 was established as TV7 based on issuance of a permit by Department of Trade and Industry in Central Jakarta (No. 809/BH.09.05/III/2000). 80% of its share is largely owned by Kompas Gramedia Group. On 25 November 2001, the existence of TV7 was published in State Gazette No. 8687 as PT Duta Visual Nusantara Tivi Tujuh. The logo itself is the letters "JO", which stands for Jakob Oetama (1931-2020), the co-founder of Kompas Gramedia Group. The logo is also loosely based on the Circle 7 logo that used by the American broadcast network ABC for its several owned-and-operated and affiliated stations.

Iraq invasion coverage 
In the first quarter of 2003, TV7 aired daily relays of Al Jazeera during the U.S. invasion of Iraq through a news program titled Invasi ke Irak (Invasion to Iraq). In response, rival broadcaster ANTV started relaying Al Arabiya's coverage of the invasion.

Indonesian society, in general, welcomed TV7's actions, especially with those who disagreed with the Western media's side of the events. Despite rumors that then-president Megawati Soekarnoputri urged TV7 to stop the relay broadcasts of Al Jazeera, PR TV7 at the time, Uni Lubis, denied it. Even, she asserted that the relays were continued and disturbances in the relay could be resolved.

Re-launch as Trans7 

On 4 August 2006, CT Corp via Trans Corp authorized to buy a 55% stake in PT Duta Visual Nusantara Tivi Tujuh (as it noted in the book titled Chairul Tanjung si Anak Singkong; lit.: Chairul Tanjung the Cassava Child). In conjunction with Trans TV's 5th anniversary on 15 December 2006 at 19:00 local time, the channel was rebranded as Trans7, making it the second CT Corp owned television network. With the buyout and relaunch, the network moved its office to Trans TV's offices.

Directors and Commissioners

List of Chief Executive Officers

Current Directors and Commissioners

Sports Programming
Trans7 has broadcast the Premier League from 2002–2007. Trans7 broadcast Serie A from 2007-2009 and returned in 2016–17 season, LaLiga in 2012-13 season as well as International Champions Cup in 2017. In 2018, Trans7 broadcast the 2018 FIFA World Cup alongside sister channel Trans TV, also with IndiHome/UseeTV, K-Vision and MNC Sports.

Trans7 is the home of MotoGP in Indonesia for 20 years since 2002 and will continues until 2026 after obtaining a broadcast rights extension. Starting from the 2022 season and the opening of Mandalika International Street Circuit, Trans7 will also broadcast the Superbike World Championship.

Trans7 also hosts the Indonesia Open Badminton Championships coverage since 2008 until 2019 (originally until 2020, but the event cancelled due to COVID-19 pandemic), after broadcasting the Thomas and Uber Cups for 2008 (simulcast with Trans TV) and 2010 seasons.

Presenters

Current

Former
 Syahlevi Latief
 Rikha Indriaswari (now at NET.)
 Isyana Bagoes Oka
 Nina Melinda (now at Kompas TV)
 Herdina Suherdi (now at TVRI)
 Trie Ambarwati
 Andrie Djarot
 Zweta Manggarani
 Shara Virrisya
 Rahma Hayuningdyah (now at NET.)
 Maria Sabta
 Herjuno Syaputra (now at GTV and MNC News)
 Alfian Rahardjo (now at CNN Indonesia and Trans TV)
 Miladia Rahma
 Rully Kurniawan
 Hadijah Aljufri
 Angky Prita
 Mira Khairunnisa
 Fiantika Ambadar
 Anggita Suryo
 Lely Hermawan
 Sabrina Luiss
 Ratna Mariana
 Cindy Agustina
 Medina Kamil
 Putri Raemawasti
 Rieda Anindita
 Melisa Gandasari (now at CNBC Indonesia)
 Dian Ayu Lestari
 Annisa Pohan
 Rio Indrawan
 Ira Nova
 Monica Noeva
 Putri Windasari (now at tvOne)
 Yasmine Naomi
 Dilla Hantika
 Rory Asyari (now at SEA Today)
 Kamidia Radisti
 Hayomi Rinjani
 Rizal Yusacc (now at iNews)
 Roland Lagonda
 Bram Herlambang (now at CNN Indonesia)
 Benny Dermawan (now at CNN Indonesia)

See also 
List of television stations in Indonesia
Trans TV
Television in Indonesia

References

External links 
   Official Site

Television networks in Indonesia
Television channels and stations established in 2001
Trans Media
Kompas Gramedia Group